Kanapia is a genus of flowering plants in the family Rubiaceae. The genus is endemic to the Philippines. It was described when two former Canthium species were transferred to this new genus.

Species
Kanapia monstrosa 
Kanapia wenzelii

References

Rubiaceae genera
Vanguerieae
Endemic flora of the Philippines